Michael Dorman (born 26 April 1981) is a New Zealand actor, best known for his starring roles as NASA astronaut Gordo Stevens in the Apple TV+ original science fiction space drama series For All Mankind and as John Tavner in the comedy-drama series Patriot. Other roles include Tom Wilcox in the Australian television comedy-drama Wonderland, Tom Griffin in the 2020 horror film The Invisible Man, and supporting work on TV shows like The Secret Life of Us and in films including West. In 2021 it was announced that he would star as the title character of the  Joe Pickett television series, based on the books by C.J. Box. The show premiered for viewing on the Spectrum Network in December, 2021 and Paramount+ streaming service in February, 2022.

Filmography

References

External links

1981 births
Living people
New Zealand male film actors
New Zealand male television actors
New Zealand expatriates in Australia
New Zealand expatriates in the United States
People from Auckland
21st-century New Zealand male actors